June Halliday AM is a biochemist and researcher of liver disease and iron metabolism. She is a pioneer in the use of serum ferritin and liver iron concentration as diagnostic aids for studying haemochromatosis.

Early life 
June Wanda Halliday (was born June von Alpen) in 1930 in Brisbane, Queensland. She attended Somerville House girls' school from 1937 to 1946 and was School Captain. She studied her BSc at the University of Queensland from 1947, graduating with Honours in 1949. One of her early mentors was Ian Mackerras, the first director of the Queensland Institute of Medical Research. She undertook vacation research work with fellow student Marion Gillies, under the oversight of Dr MacKerras’ wife, parasitologist and researcher Dr Josephine MacKerras. She married microbiologist William Halliday in August 1952. She won a Fulbright grant to study overseas and from 1952 to 1955 undertook research toward a PhD at the University of Wisconsin. Her thesis was on biochemistry and bacteriology. Her husband also undertook his doctorate while in the U.S. Upon graduation, she took up a position with the Middlesex Hospital London as a Postdoctoral Research Fellow in the Courtnauld Institute of Biochemistry.

Career 
Halliday returned to Australia in 1956 and lectured in biochemistry with the Department of Pathology of the University of Queensland, researching lead poisoning and haematological problems. University policy at the time would not permit her to work full-time after the birth of her first child. The university relaxed that position in time, and she returned to part-time lecturing and research. In 1967 she moved to the Department of Medicine as an NHMRC Senior Research Officer and remained with this department until 1990. She became Professor and Head of the Liver Unit of the Queensland Institute of Medical Research in 1990. Halliday retired in 1996.

Later life 
Halliday was honoured with an Order of Australia Medal (A.M.) for services to medical research in 1990.

A Festschrift celebrating her career with the Queensland Institute of Medical Research was prepared in 1996.

She was Secretary/Treasurer of the International Association for the Study of the Liver and President of the Gastroenterological Society of Queensland.

Personal life 
Halliday married fellow student William J. Halliday of Melbourne in 1952. They had three children.

References 

Living people
1930 births
Australian biochemists
Australian women chemists
Academic staff of the University of Queensland
University of Queensland alumni